Semera Airport  is an airport serving Semera, a city in the Afar Region of Ethiopia.

The airport is on the west side of the village. The former gravel runway was paved and a terminal complex added after 2016.

Airlines and destinations

See also
Transport in Ethiopia
List of airports in Ethiopia

References

External links
OpenStreetMap - Semera
OurAirports - Semera

Airports in Ethiopia